John Phillip Wingard Sr. (August 26, 1927 – June 10, 2021) was an American politician and farmer in the state of Minnesota. He served in the Minnesota House of Representatives from 1963–1973.

Wingard was born in Brooklyn Center, Minnesota and graduated from Brooklyn Park High School. He later moved to Champlin, Minnesota. Wingard received his bachelor's degree in history from the University of Minnesota in 1949. Wingate was a Republican. Wingate served as a justice of the peace for the city of Brooklyn Center from 1954 to 1962. He was a potato farmer and the owner of the Wingate Farms Potato Company.

References

1927 births
2021 deaths
People from Brooklyn Center, Minnesota
University of Minnesota alumni
Farmers from Minnesota
Republican Party members of the Minnesota House of Representatives